Doto onusta is a species of sea slug, a nudibranch, a marine gastropod mollusc in the family Dotidae.

It is considered a dubious synonym of Doto floridicola Simroth, 1888 by the World Register of Marine Species

Distribution
This species was first described from Brittany, France. It has rarely been reported since the original description. Henning Lemche identified it with the common species which feeds on the hydroid Dynamena pumila, predominantly in the intertidal region.

Description
This nudibranch is translucent white with dark red spots on the ceratal tubercles. The back and sides are spattered with red pigment which extends up the inner faces of the rhinophore sheaths. It is illustrated in colour in a more detailed publication by Hesse in 1873.

EcologyDoto onusta feeds on the hydroid Dynamena pumila'', family Sertulariidae.

References

Dotidae
Gastropods described in 1872